Yapsin 1 (yeast aspartic protease 3, Yap3 gene product (Saccharomyces cerevisiae)) is an enzyme. This enzyme catalyses the following chemical reaction

 Hydrolyses various precursor proteins with Arg or Lys in P1, and commonly Arg or Lys also in P2. The P3 amino acid is usually non-polar, but otherwise additional basic amino acids are favourable in both non-prime and prime positions

This enzyme belongs to the peptidase family A1 of pepsin.

References

External links 
 

EC 3.4.23